Naung Mon (also known as Naungwan) was a Shan state in what is today Burma.

Naung Mon သည် ရှမ်းပြည်နယ်တောင်ပိုင်း၊ဆီဆိုင်မြမို့နယ်။တောင်ကြီးခရိုင်တွင်တည်ရှိသည်။

References

Shan States